Lauriston S. Taylor (1 June 1902 – 26 November 2004) was an American physicist known for his work in the field of radiation protection and measurement.

Career
He established standards for X-ray radiation exposure for the first time in the 1920s, which eventually led to a group of government organizations that set the standards over the next 50 years. Taylor remained active in debates about radiation exposure into his 80s, often advocating the viewpoint that small doses of radiation were not important.

Accolades
He served as president of the Health Physics Society (HPS) from 1958 to 1959. He was a recipient of the Medal of Freedom, and the Presidential Bronze Star (then the highest military award that could be given to a civilian).

Vignettes of early radiation workers
In 1977 the Food and Drug Administration of the U.S. Department of Health and Human Services initiated a series of 25 recorded interviews with early radiation workers to provide an historical overview of their research and discoveries primarily in the fields of medical physics, radiation, and radiobiology. Lauriston S. Taylor moderated the series and also was an interview subject.

Interview subjects
 Howard Andrews
 Walter Binks, physicist and specialist in radiology
 Carl Bjorn Braestrup
 Austin M. Brues, physician National Research Council
 Robley Evans
 George Henny
 Paul Henshaw, physician National Research Council
 Norman Hilberry, "Mr. Scram", axe man at the first chain reaction for Chicago Pile 1, Director of Argonne National Laboratory, 1957-1961
 Lillian E. Jacobson, Physicist, Radiotherapy Department and Laboratory Division of Montefiore Hospital, New York 
 Harold E. Johns, Canadian medical physicist
 George Laurence, Canadian nuclear physicist
 John H. Lawrence, American physicist and physician, nuclear medicine pioneer
 Herbert M. Parker, English born, American pioneer in  medical radiation therapy and radiation safety
 Sir Edward Eric Pochin, British physician, specialist in ionizing radiation safety
 Edith Quimby, American medical researcher and physicist, pioneer in nuclear medicine
 John E. Rose, health physicist
 Roberts Rugh, Department of Radiology, Columbia University, directed research on the effects of ionizing radiation, served as senior medical consultant
 Eric E. Smith, British specialist in the field of ionizing radiation
 James Newell Stannard, radiobiologist, Pharmacologist and Physiologist at the National Institutes of Health
 Lauriston Sale "Laurie" Taylor
 E. Dale Trout, radiologist, Professor Emeritus of Radiological Physics, Oregon State University
 John G. Trump, American high-voltage engineer and physicist
 John Austin "Jack" Victoreen, self-taught radio engineer, pioneer of radiation detection instruments
 Samuel Reid Warren Jr., professor in electrical engineering at the University of Pennsylvania and radiation physicist
 Shields Warren, pioneer pathologist and expert in medical radiation
 Marvin Martin Dixon Williams, pioneer in medical physics, head of physics at the Mayo Clinic
 Harold O. Wyckoff, pioneer in measurement of radiation and radiation protection standards

References

External links 

 Lauriston Sale Taylor Papers, 1904-1999 (inclusive), 1928-1989 (bulk). H MS c334. Harvard Medical Library, Francis A. Countway Library of Medicine, Boston, Mass.

1902 births
2004 deaths
20th-century American physicists
Health physicists
Cornell University alumni
Radiation health effects researchers
Radiation protection
Recipients of the Medal of Freedom
American centenarians
Men centenarians
Health Physics Society
Bell Labs
National Institute of Standards and Technology
Fellows of the American Physical Society